Madavar Vilagam Vaidyanathar temple is a Shiva temple located in Madavar Vilagam, located in one kilometer southerly to Srivilliputhur in Virudhunagar district in the South Indian state of Tamil Nadu, is dedicated to the Hindu god Shiva. Constructed in the Dravidian style of architecture, the temple has two precincts. Shiva is worshiped as Vaidyanathar and his consort Parvati as Sivakami. The temple is the largest Shiva temple in the district.
Shiva is worshipped as Vaidyanathar or the "God of healing". The holy water of the Siddhamirtham tank in the temple complex is believed to have curative effects, and a holy dip here is believed to cure all diseases. The temple was built by Thirumalai Nayak during the 16th century.

A granite wall surrounds the temple, enclosing all its shrines. The temple has a five-tiered gateway tower originally built by Chandrakula Pandya Vijayanagar and Nayak kings commissioned pillared halls and major shrines of the temple during the 16th century. The temple has artistic sculptures representative of Nayak art.

The temple is open from 6 am - 12 pm and 4-7 pm on all days except during festival days when it is open all day. Four daily rituals and three yearly festivals are held at the temple, of which the twin festivals during the full moon days of Tamil month Adi (July – August) and Thai (January – February) being the most prominent. The temple is maintained and administered by the Hindu Religious and Endowment Board of the Government of Tamil Nadu.

Legend and History

As per Hindu legend, Shiva appeared for a staunch devotee in the form of her mother to help her delivery. To quench her thirst, Shiva is believed to have split his toe nail that resulted in a spring in the form of Siddhamritha tank. As per local legend, the Nayak king Thirumalai Nayak suffered from stomach pain and he arrived at Madavar Vilagam in an ivory palanquin and stayed there for 48 days. He was completely cured and as a mark of his gratitude, he constructed the Natarajar hall as in Madurai Meenakshi temple. He also built drum halls from the temple to Madurai as he would take his midday meal only after hearing the drum sounds indicating the completion of mid day worship in the temple. There are many inscriptions in the temple from the Pandya dynasty and Thirumalai Nayak indicating various grants to the temple. The Pandya inscriptions refer the temple name as Thirukkattralishvaram Udaiyar.

Architecture 
The temple has a five-tiered gopuram (temple tower) and large precincts.  The central shrine is that of Vaidyanathar present as lingam in the inner most sanctum.  The first precinct around the sanctum has the metal images of Somaskanda and stone sculptures of Nataraja, Durga, Dakshinamoorthy, Surya (Sun god). The shrine of Sivakami is located in a parallel shrine to the right of the sanctum. There are two gates to the temple, each leading to the Shiva and Sivakami shrines. The Sthala Vriksha (temple tree) is margosa (Azadirachta indica) which possesses medicinal properties. The temple has two water tanks, one located opposite to the temple and one right to the main gate. The Siddhamirdham tank located opposite to the temple is believed to be having curating effects where worshipers take a holy dip. The temple has a Kalayana Mahal (marriage hall) in front of the Sivakami shrine and the sculpture of Nayak king can be found there. There are paintings from the Nayak period in ceiling of the hall leading to the sanctum. In modern times, the temple is maintained and administered by the Hindu Religious and Endowment Board of the Government of Tamil Nadu.

Worship and religious practices

The temple priests perform the puja (rituals) during festivals and on a daily basis. Like other Shiva temples of Tamil Nadu, the priests belong to the Shaiva community, a Brahmin sub-caste. The temple rituals are performed six times a day; Ushathkalam at 7 a.m., Kalasanthi at 8:00 a.m., Uchikalam at 10:00 a.m., Sayarakshai at 5:00 p.m., Irandamkalam at 7:00 p.m. and Ardha Jamam at 8:00 p.m. Each ritual comprises four steps: abhisheka (sacred bath), alangaram (decoration), naivethanam (food offering) and deepa aradanai (waving of lamps) for both Vaidyanathar and Sivakami Amman. The worship is held amidst music with nagaswaram (pipe instrument) and tavil (percussion instrument), religious instructions in the Vedas (sacred texts) read by priests and prostration by worshippers in front of the temple mast. The twin festivals celebrated during the full moon days of Tamil month Adi (July – August) and Thai (January – February) attract large number of pilgrims from whole of Tamil Nadu.
Madavar Valagam is one of the holy places where lord Siva is believed to have performed his miracles called Thiruvilaiyadal. On the first day of the  Tamil month of Panguni (March-April), the rays of Sun fall on the presiding deity, Vidyanathaswami when special worship is performed to sun on this day.

References

External links

http://www.madavarvalakamvaidyanathartemple.tnhrce.in/
Hindu temples in Virudhunagar district